Chilcott is a surname. Notable people with the surname include:

 Arthur Chilcott (born 1963), Australian footballer
 Bert Chilcott (1918–1992), Australian footballer
 Bob Chilcott (born 1955), British choral composer
 Cliff Chilcott (1898–1970), Canadian wrestler
 Dominick Chilcott (born 1959), British diplomat
 Izzy Wright (née Chilcott) (born 1990), Australian basketball player
 Gareth Chilcott (born 1956), English rugby player
 George M. Chilcott (1828–1891), American politician
 Jack Chilcott, Welsh rugby player
 Kate Chilcott, road cyclist from New Zealand
 Lesley Chilcott, American film producer and director
 Martin Chilcott (born 1965), British entrepreneur
 Stephen Chilcott, BBC radio editor
 Steve Chilcott (born 1948), American baseball player
 Susan Chilcott (1963–2003), English soprano
 Ted Chilcott (1924–2003), Canadian Olympic rower
 Warden Chilcott, British Member of Parliament (1918–1929)

See also
 Warner Chilcott, pharmaceutical company
 Chilcot (surname)
 Chilcot Inquiry